Shujaat Ali Khan (born 23 April 1964) has been Justice of the Lahore High Court since 27 March 2012.

References

1964 births
Living people
Judges of the Lahore High Court
Pakistani judges
Academic staff of Aitchison College
Government College University, Lahore alumni
Forman Christian College alumni
Punjab University Law College alumni